Uvaldo Acosta (May 16, 1965 – February 12, 1998) was an American male volleyball player. He was part of the United States men's national volleyball team at the 1990 FIVB Volleyball Men's World Championship in Brazil.

Acosta played for George Mason University, where he was later a coach.

He drowned in Hawaii on February 12, 1998. He was 32 years old at the time of his death. and was posthumously inducted into the Eastern Intercollegiate Volleyball Association's Hall of Fame in 2012. The Eastern Intercollegiate Volleyball Association (EIVA) Player of the Year award was renamed the Uvaldo Acosta Memorial award in his honor, and George Mason hosted the inaugural Uvaldo Acosta Invitational in 2018.

References

1965 births
1998 deaths
American men's volleyball players
George Mason Patriots men's volleyball players
George Mason Patriots men's volleyball coaches
Sportspeople from El Paso, Texas
Deaths by drowning in the United States
Accidental deaths in Hawaii